Mutual liberty is an idea first developed by Alexis de Tocqueville in his 1835 work Democracy in America. In effect, Tocqueville was referring to the general nature of American society during the 19th century. It appeared to him, at least on the surface, that every citizen in the United States had the opportunity to participate in the civic activities of the country. Another way to look at mutual liberty is by accounting for the collective free wills of every rational being in a community.

Even though the notion of mutual liberty was introduced by Tocqueville, it was John Stuart Mill who greatly expanded it. Mill believed that the most proper occasion for mutual liberty was in a community governed by the consent of the governed, i.e., a republic. And according to Mill, it is only in a republic where members of all political factions can participate.

It has been said that a republic is the form of government that divides people least. This statement pertains greatly to mutual liberty. Unlike positive and negative liberty, mutual liberty encompasses all citizens. It makes no distinction between political preference and social status. Mutual liberty pervades all sectors of society, from the homeless man on the street to the premier of the state. It is the process through which a general sense of morality gets exerted on the widest range of people in any given communal setting.

References

External links
John Stuart Mill in the Stanford Encyclopedia of Philosophy
In Search of Tocqueville's Democracy in America, information and resources about Alexis de Tocqueville.

Liberalism
Philosophy of law
Social concepts
Free will
1835 introductions